Ankur is an Indian masculine given name:

Athletes
Ankur Diwakar (born 1991), Indian eSports athlete
Ankur Julka (born 1987), Indian cricketer
Ankur Mittal (born 1992), Indian shooter
Ankur Poseria (born 1987), American swimmer
Ankur Vasishta (born 1982), Hong Kong cricketer

Entrepreneurs
Ankur Garg (born 1982), Indian social entrepreneurs
Ankur Jain (born c. 1990), American entrepreneur
Ankur Warikoo (born 1980), Internet entrepreneur

Actors
Ankur Bhatia (born 1982), Indian actor
Ankur Nayyar (born 1967), Indian actor
Ankur Vikal, Indian actor

Other
Ankur Betageri (born 1983), Indian poet/writer

See also

Masculine given names